Andi Bakiasi (born 2 October 1988) is an Albanian footballer who currently plays as a defender for Shkumbini in the Albanian First Division.

References

1988 births
Living people
Sportspeople from Lushnjë
Albanian footballers
Association football defenders
KS Lushnja players
KF Skrapari players
KF Teuta Durrës players
FK Tomori Berat players
Luftëtari Gjirokastër players
KS Shkumbini Peqin players
KS Egnatia Rrogozhinë players
Kategoria Superiore players